This is a list of electrochemists.

Electrochemists

 Alexander Frumkin
 Faiza Al-Kharafi
 John Alfred Valentine Butler
 Hans Falkenhagen
 Martin Fleischmann
 Alexander Frumkin
 Heinz Gerischer
 Johann Wilhelm Hittorf
 Friedrich Kohlrausch
 Ivan Ostromislensky
 Stanley Pons
 Jean-Michel Savéant
 Julius Tafel
 Nicolae Vasilescu-Karpen
 Max Volmer
 Oliver Patterson Watts

See also
 Electrochemistry
 Faraday Medal (electrochemistry)
 Asian Conference on Electrochemical Power Sources

Electrochemists